Eucalyptus staigeriana, commonly known as the lemon-scented ironbark, is a species of small ironbark tree that is endemic to the Cape York Peninsula. It has rough ironbark on the trunk and branches, lance-shaped to egg-shaped leaves that smell of lemons when crushed, flower buds in groups of seven, white flowers and oval to spindle-shaped fruit.

Description
It has rough, dark grey or black ironbark on the trunk and branches. The leaves smell strongly of lemons when crushed. Flowering occurs from December to February and the flowers are white.

Taxonomy and naming
Eucalyptus staigeriana was first formally described in 1883 by Frederick Manson Bailey from an unpublished description by Ferdinand von Mueller. The description was published in Bailey's book A Synopsis of the Queensland Flora. The specific epithet (staigeriana) honours Karl Theodore Staiger (1833-1888).

Distribution and habitat
The lemon-scented ironbark grows in woodland and open forest in hilly country on the eastern side of the Cape York Peninsula.

Conservation status
This eucalypt is classified as "least concern" under the Queensland Government Nature Conservation Act 1992.

Uses
The complex essential oil is distilled from the leaves and used for flavouring, perfumery and aromatherapy. It has a fruity-lemon fragrance with rosemary-like back tones. E. staigeriana fresh weight leaves yield 2.9–3.4% essential oil. It contains a range of essential oil components, including geranial, methyl geranate, geranyl acetate, limonene, phellandrene, neral, terpinolene and geraniol.

Brazil and Guatemala are the major producers of Eucalyptus staigeriana oil, with Brazil producing up to 60 tonnes pa.

References

 Boland et al., Eucalyptus Leaf Oils – Use, Chemistry, Distillation and Marketing, .

External links
 Plant profile, including cultivation requirements 

Bushfood
Flora of Queensland
staigeriana
Myrtales of Australia
Trees of Australia
Crops originating from Australia
Plants described in 1883
Taxa named by Ferdinand von Mueller
Taxa named by Frederick Manson Bailey